Technical may refer to:

 Technical (vehicle), an improvised fighting vehicle
 Technical analysis, a discipline for forecasting the future direction of prices through the study of past market data
 Technical drawing, showing how something is constructed or functions (also known as drafting) 
 Technical file, a set of technical drawings
 Technical death metal, a subgenre of death metal that focuses on complex rhythms, riffs, and song structures
 Technical foul, an infraction of the rules in basketball usually concerning unsportsmanlike non-contact behavior
 Technical geography, one of the main branches of geography
 Technical rehearsal for a performance, often simply referred to as a technical
 Technical support, a range of services providing assistance with technology products
 Vocational education, often known as technical education
 Legal technicality, an aspect of law

See also 
 Lego Technic, a line of Lego toys
 Tech (disambiguation)
 Technicals (disambiguation)
 Technics (disambiguation)
 Technique (disambiguation)
 Technology (disambiguation)